Technology in science fiction is a crucial aspect of the genre.  

As science fiction emerged during the era of Industrial Revolution, the increased presence of machines in everyday life and their role in shaping of the society was a major influence on the genre. It appeared as a major element of the Proto SF, represented by machines and gadgets in works of Jules Verne, George Griffith, H. G. Wells, Edward Bellamy and others. Technology has been portrayed both in positive or negative ways; in some works it is a solution to the world problems, in others, a means of its destruction. Such things as robots and space travel became commonplace in the fiction of the 19th century. 

Concepts and illustrations of technology in science fiction have been a significant influence in the formation of popular culture images of future technology. 

Science fiction has often affected innovation and new technology – for example many rocketry pioneers were inspired by science fiction.

See also 

 Emerging technologies
 Hypothetical technology
 Mad scientist
 Technobabble
 Technology forecasting

References

Science fiction themes
Fictional technology